The Cosmos Echo is a French single-seat, ultralight trike that is produced by Cosmos ULM. The aircraft is only supplied as a completed aircraft and is not available as a kit.

Design and development
The Echo was designed to comply with the European Fédération Aéronautique Internationale microlight classification and has been used in microlight competition flying. It features a cable-braced hang glider-style high-wing, weight-shift controls, a single-seat, open cockpit, tricycle landing gear and a single engine in pusher configuration.

The aircraft wing is made from bolted-together aluminium tubing, with its double surface wing covered in Dacron sailcloth. A number of different wings can be fitted, including the Top 12.9. The wing is supported by a single tube-type kingpost and uses an "A" frame control bar. Optional equipment includes a cockpit fairing and wheel pants. Engines used are the  Rotax 503 twin cylinder, two-stroke and  Rotax 447 powerplants

Variants
Echo 12
With the  Rotax 503 twin cylinder, two-stroke engine and the Top 12.9 wing.
Echo Fun
With the  Rotax 447 twin cylinder, two-stroke engine.
Echo Racer
With the  Rotax 503 twin cylinder, two-stroke engine.

Specifications (Echo Racer)

References

External links

Photo of a Cosmos Echo

1990s French ultralight aircraft
Single-engined pusher aircraft
Ultralight trikes